Darren Cahill and Wally Masur were the defending champions. Cahill did not compete that year, while Masur partnered Brad Drewett, but lost in the first round.Pat Cash and Mark Kratzmann won the title, defeating Pieter Aldrich and Danie Visser 6–4, 7–5, in the final.

Seeds

  Pieter Aldrich /  Danie Visser (final)
  Paul Annacone /  Christo van Rensburg (first round)
  Goran Ivanišević /  Petr Korda (semifinals)
  Tomás Carbonell /  Leonardo Lavalle (first round)

Draw

Draw

References
General

1990 Holden NSW Open